Belltrees Peel is a medieval tower situated on a peninsula in Castle Semple Loch in Renfrewshire, Scotland, on which was once an island.

History 
The tower was constructed between 1547 and 1572 as an unusual, low tower, with an irregular hexagonal plan. The remains of the tower house are protected as a scheduled monument.

It was a Semple property, and was occupied by Sir James Semple of Belltrees. He was educated with James VI, an acted as Ambassador to France in 1601. The Semples later used the Belltrees Peel as a shelter when sailing on Castle Semple Loch.

References

Buildings and structures in Renfrewshire
Castles in Renfrewshire
Scheduled Ancient Monuments in Renfrewshire
Tower houses in Scotland